Brian Rast (born November 8, 1981) is a professional poker player living in Las Vegas, Nevada.

Early life, education 
Brian Rast was born on November 8, 1981, in Denver, Colorado, where he lived until 1990 when he moved to Poway, California. Rast attended Poway High School where he became the Class of 2000 valedictorian, earning his way to Stanford University. Brian always loved strategic games, and although being familiar with poker dating back to high school, Brian started playing weekly at the Stanford Poker Club (founded by his friend Mike Asmar) in the spring of 2003. That summer Brian went home to Poway determined to learn how to play poker and make some money. Rast started buying and reading as many poker books as he could. He took a temp job and used that money to fund his poker habit, playing online and live at Barona Casino. Within five weeks, Rast had quit his temp job to focus full time on poker for the remainder of the summer. Rast made $20,000 his first summer playing. By 2004, he had dropped out of school to pursue a career in poker.

Early personal life and poker career 
For the next few months, Brian continued to live in the Palo Alto area playing poker both live and online. In the summer of 2005, he left the Bay Area and took his first shot at the World Series of Poker in Las Vegas. Soon he was back living in Poway, playing online and making regular trips to Commerce Casino & Las Vegas to play live. He eventually chose Las Vegas over Los Angeles. After making numerous trips where he stayed at Bellagio, sometimes for over 25 days in a month, he finally decided to rent a place in Henderson and move out to Vegas permanently in 2007. Then in mid-2008, he bought his first place at Panorama Towers—a highrise where many other poker players live. He quickly met and became good friends with some other poker players in Las Vegas, notably Keith Gipson, Andrew Robl, Antonio Esfandiari, and Phil Laak. By late 2009, Andrew, Antonio, Brian, and Keith along with Dan Fleyshman and Dan Bilzerian decided to form Victory Poker—a poker website that ultimately shut down after Black Friday. In January 2010, Laak convinced Brian to travel to Brazil with him. While in Rio de Janeiro near the end of the trip, Brian met Juliana Karla Carlos da Silva while out drinking. Despite two failed US VISA attempts, Brian and Juliana talked daily on Skype and Brian made numerous trips to Brazil to continue the relationship. The couple were engaged later that year and found themselves trying for a third visa, a fiancé visa. The 2011 WSOP happened during the lead-up to the fiancé visa and marks a special time professionally for Brian as he also won 2 WSOP bracelets, including the prestigious $50,000 Poker Player's Championship during this period. Missing the Main Event that year, Brian flew to Brazil to accompany Juliana for the fiancé visa interview. It was accepted. Within a few months, she and her son Krishna came to the USA where Brian and her married in November.

Online poker 
In the online poker world, Rast is known as tsarrast on both Full Tilt Poker and PokerStars. Rast was primarily a cash game player online and played very few poker tournaments. He has very limited tournament results, playing a small volume in 2007 and again in 2016, and barely any in between. Despite the small volume, Rast has some impressive online tournament results which include finishing 3rd in Full Tilt Poker's FTOPS III Main Event in 2007 for $114,203.50., finishing 3rd in PokerStars Sunday Million in 2008 for $73,490 and finishing 3rd in a $2,100 NLHE SCOOP in 2016 for $155,600.
Rast also produced some training videos online. He was one of the pros from the online poker training site Poker VT  as well as RunItOnce.

World Series of Poker 
Rast has five World Series of Poker bracelets, two of them he won at the 2011 World Series of Poker.
His first was in the $1,500 Pot-Limit Hold'em event where he earned $227,232 after he defeated poker professional Allen Kessler heads-up,

His second was in the $50,000 Players Championship, the second highest buy-in event that awards third highest prize money of $1,720,328, also award is the David "Chip" Reese memorial trophy and what was described by Andrew Feldman of ESPN as "the most prestigious bracelet of the Series".
The Players Championship started out with a field of 128 players and after four days of play in a mixed game format known as 8-Game, the format was switch to No-Limit Texas Hold'em on the fifth day when the final table of eight was set with following noted poker professionals and where they finished: Ben Lamb (8th), Scott Seiver (7th), PokerStars Pro and SuperNova Elite George Lind (6th), Matt Glantz (5th), Owais Ahmed (4th) and Minh Ly (3rd).

When heads-up play began, Rast was up against 11-time bracelet winner Phil Hellmuth, who was trying to capture his 12th bracelet in his third heads-up match of the 2011 series. As the match progressed, Hellmuth established a 5-1 chip lead on Rast; however, Rast gained the lead after a series of draws that failed to improve Hellmuth's hands. Rast captured the bracelet when Hellmuth's flush draw failed to improve against Rast's King high straight.

His other results at the WSOP include a 9th-place finish in the 2008 World Series of Poker $5,000 Pot-Limit Omaha with Rebuys event for $84,863, 14th at the 2009 World Series of Poker in the $40,000 No-Limit Hold'em event for $128,665 and at the 2010 World Series of Poker he finished in the money, coming in 537th place out of 7,319 player for $24,079.

At the 2012 World Series of Poker, Rast made two final tables sixth place in the $1,500 No Limit Hold'em Re-entry for $137,632 and sixth place in the $1,000,000 Big One for One Drop for $1,621,333.

Brian won his second Poker Players Championship bracelet at the 2016 World Series of Poker, beating Justin Bonomo heads up and winning $1,296,097.

At the 2018 World Series of Poker, Rast won his fourth bracelet, and $259,670, in the $10,000 No-Limit 2-7 Lowball Draw Championship event. Ten-time bracelet winner Doyle Brunson, four-time bracelet winner John Hennigan, and two-time bracelet winner Mike Wattel, whom Rast defeated in heads-up play, were among the players at the final table.

World Series of Poker bracelets

Other career results (cash/tournament) 

Around 2010, Brian started making regular trips to Macau to play cash games, playing in both the Wynn games and the Starworld games. Brian would go regularly to Macau until 2014. In fact, for the first 10 years of his career Brian was primarily a cash game player. But with online poker made difficult to play in the USA after "Black Friday"
, the changing cash game scene, as well as tournament success in 2011-2013, Brian soon started playing more tournaments. In the last few years since 2014, Brian has increased the number of tournaments he plays and now can reasonably be called both a cash game and tournament player. Even though Brian's made tournaments more of a priority, he still enjoys playing cash games. When in Vegas, he can regularly be found playing in the mixed games in Bobby's Room at the Bellagio, Ivey's Room at the Aria, or any other high stakes game of any kind that happen to run.

In December 2013, Brian won the World Poker Tour Doyle Brunson Five Diamond World Poker Classic $100,000 High Roller at the Bellagio by defeating Erik Seidel heads up for the title, taking home a prize of $1,083,500.

During the 2015 WSOP, Brian Rast won the 1st inaugural Super High Roller Bowl played at the Aria casino in Las Vegas, taking home over 7.5 million dollars, besting Scott Seiver heads-up, and a 43 player field in total. It stands as his largest single tournament win.

As of January 2020, his total live tournament earnings exceed $21,500,000. 
He has now also cashed for over $1 million in tournaments for seven years in a row (2011 - 2017), and is the only person to ever do this.

Notes

External links
PocketFives profile
Bluff Magazine profile
TwoPlusTwo PokerCast Interview of Brian Rast
The PokerStars.net Big Game profile

1981 births
Living people
World Series of Poker bracelet winners
American poker players
People from the Las Vegas Valley